The Landau–Zener formula is an analytic solution to the equations of motion governing the transition dynamics of a two-state quantum system, with a time-dependent Hamiltonian varying such that the energy separation of the two states is a linear function of time. The formula, giving the probability of a diabatic (not adiabatic) transition between the two energy states, was published separately by Lev Landau, Clarence Zener, Ernst Stueckelberg, and Ettore Majorana, in 1932.

If the system starts, in the infinite past, in the lower energy eigenstate, we wish to calculate the probability of finding the system in the upper energy eigenstate in the infinite future (a so-called Landau–Zener transition). For infinitely slow variation of the energy difference (that is, a Landau–Zener velocity of zero), the adiabatic theorem tells us that no such transition will take place, as the system will always be in an instantaneous eigenstate of the Hamiltonian at that moment in time. At non-zero velocities, transitions occur with probability as described by the Landau–Zener formula.

Conditions and approximation 

Such transitions occur between states of the entire system, hence any description of the system must include all external influences, including collisions and external electric and magnetic fields. In order that the equations of motion for the system might be solved analytically, a set of simplifications are made, known collectively as the Landau–Zener approximation. The simplifications are as follows:

 The perturbation parameter in the Hamiltonian is a known, linear function of time
 The energy separation of the diabatic states varies linearly with time
 The coupling in the diabatic Hamiltonian matrix is independent of time

The first simplification makes this a semi-classical treatment. In the case of an atom in a magnetic field, the field strength becomes a classical variable which can be precisely measured during the transition. This requirement is quite restrictive as a linear change will not, in general, be the optimal profile to achieve the desired transition probability.

The second simplification allows us to make the substitution

For the case of an atom in a magnetic field this corresponds to a linear change in magnetic field. For a linear Zeeman shift this follows directly from point 1.

The final simplification requires that the time–dependent perturbation does not couple the diabatic states; rather, the coupling must be due to a static deviation from a  Coulomb potential, commonly described by a quantum defect.

Formula 

The details of Zener's solution are somewhat opaque, relying on a set of substitutions to put the equation of motion into the form of the Weber equation and using the known solution. A more transparent solution is provided by Curt Wittig using contour integration.

The key figure of merit in this approach is the Landau–Zener velocity:

A large  results in a large diabatic transition probability and vice versa.

Using the Landau–Zener formula the probability, of a diabatic transition is given by

The quantity  is the off-diagonal element of the two-level system's Hamiltonian coupling the bases, and as such it is half the distance between the two unperturbed eigenenergies at the avoided crossing, when .

Multistate problem 
The simplest generalization of the two-state Landau–Zener model is a multistate system with a Hamiltonian of the form

,

where A and B are Hermitian NxN matrices with time-independent elements. The goal of the multistate Landau–Zener theory is to determine elements of the scattering matrix and the transition probabilities between states of this model after evolution with such a Hamiltonian from negative infinite to positive infinite time. The transition probabilities are the absolute value squared of scattering matrix elements.

There are exact formulas, called hierarchy constraints, that provide analytical expressions for special elements of the scattering matrix in any multi-state Landau–Zener model. Special cases of these relations are known as the Brundobler–Elser (BE) formula ,), and the no-go theorem,. Discrete symmetries often lead to constraints that reduce the number of independent elements of the scattering matrix.

There are also integrability conditions that, when they are satisfied, lead to exact expressions for the entire scattering matrices in multistate Landau–Zener models. Numerous such completely solvable models have been identified, including:
 Demkov–Osherov model that describes a single level that crosses a band of parallel levels. A surprising fact about the solution of this model is coincidence of the exactly obtained transition probability matrix with its form obtained with a simple semiclassical independent crossing approximation. With some generalizations, this property appears in almost all solvable Landau–Zener systems with a finite number of interacting states.
 Generalized bow-tie model. The model describes coupling of two (or one in the degenerate case limit) levels to a set of otherwise noninteracting diabatic states that cross at a single point.    
 Driven Tavis–Cummings model describes interaction of N spins-½ with a bosonic mode in a linearly time-dependent magnetic field. This is the richest known solved system. It has combinatorial complexity: the dimension of its state vector space is growing exponentially with the number of spins N. The transition probabilities in this model are described by the q-deformed binomial statistics. This solution has found practical applications in physics of Bose-Einstein condensates.
 Spin clusters interacting with time-dependent magnetic fields. This class of models shows relatively complex behavior of the transition probabilities due to the path interference effects in the semiclassical independent crossing approximation. 
 Reducible (or composite) multistate Landau–Zener models. This class consists of systems that can be decoupled to subsets of other solvable and simpler models by a symmetry transformation. The notable example is an arbitrary spin Hamiltonian , where Sz and Sx are spin operators, and S>1/2; b and g are constant parameters. This is the earliest known solvable system, which was discussed by Majorana in 1932. Among the other examples there are models of a pair of degenerate level crossing, and the 1D quantum Ising chain in a linearly changing magnetic field.
Landau–Zener transitions in infinite linear chains. This class contains the systems with formally infinite number of interacting states. Although most known their instances can be obtained as limits of the finite size models (such as the Tavis–Cummings model), there are also cases that do not belong to this classification. For example, there are solvable infinite chains with nonzero couplings between non-nearest states.

Study of noise 
Applications of the Landau–Zener solution to the problems of quantum state preparation and manipulation with discrete degrees of freedom stimulated the study of noise and decoherence effects on the transition probability in a driven two-state system. Several compact analytical results have been derived to describe these effects, including the Kayanuma formula
 
for a strong diagonal noise, and Pokrovsky–Sinitsyn formula
 
for the coupling to a fast colored noise with off-diagonal components.

Using the Schwinger–Keldysh Green's function, a rather complete and comprehensive study on the effect of quantum noise in all parameter regimes were performed by Ao and Rammer in late 1980s, from weak to strong coupling, low to high temperature, slow to fast passage, etc. Concise analytical expressions were obtained in various limits, showing the rich behaviors of such problem. 
 
The effects of nuclear spin bath and heat bath coupling on the Landau–Zener process were explored by Sinitsyn and Prokof'ev and Pokrovsky and Sun, respectively.

Exact results in multistate Landau–Zener theory (no-go theorem and BE-formula) can be applied to Landau–Zener systems which are coupled to baths composed of infinite many oscillators and/or spin baths (dissipative Landau–Zener transitions). They provide exact expressions for transition probabilities averaged over final bath states if the evolution begins from the ground state at zero temperature, see in Ref. for oscillator baths and for universal results including spin baths in Ref.

See also 

 Nonadiabatic transition state theory
 Adiabatic theorem
 Bond softening
 Bond hardening
 Froissart-Stora equation

References 

Quantum mechanics
Lev Landau